José Félix Ribas Municipality may refer to the following places in the Venezuela:

José Félix Ribas Municipality, Aragua
José Félix Ribas Municipality, Guárico

Municipality name disambiguation pages